The Australian Country Championships are field hockey tournaments hosted annually in Australia. Unlike other National Australian Championships, the Australian Country Championships only comprise teams made up of players from country regions of each Australian state, as well as a team from the Australian Defence Force.

The 2016 edition of the tournament was held in Darwin, Northern Territory. Seven teams competed in both the men's and women's tournaments.

NSW Country were champions in both the men's and women's tournaments, defeating the ADF and QLD Country respectively. WA Country finished third in the men's tournament by defeating QLD Country, while VIC Country defeated the ADF to finish third in the women's tournament.

Teams
The following are the teams from the 2017 tournaments.

 Australian Defence Force
  NSW Country
  NT Country
  QLD Country
  SA Country
  VIC Country
  WA Country

Competition format
The tournament is played in a round robin format, with each team facing each other once. Final placings after the pool matches determine playoffs. 

The fifth and sixth placed teams contest the fifth and sixth place match, the third and fourth placed teams contest the third and fourth place match, and the top two teams compete in the final.

Competition rules
The Australian Country Championships have not adapted FIH rules of four 15–minute quarters, but instead use the old format of two 35–minute halves.

Points system

Finals matches
During finals if games end in a tie, no overtime will be played and the higher ranked team from the pool matches will finish as a higher placing.

Men's tournament

Results
Note: The following summaries comprise results from 2014 onwards, while the tournament was founded earlier.

Summaries

Team performances

Women's tournament

Results
Note: The following summaries comprise results from 2014 onwards, while the tournament was founded earlier.

Summaries

Team performances

References

 
Field hockey competitions in Australia